Hindu denominations, sampradayas, traditions, movements, and sects are traditions and sub-traditions within Hinduism centered on one or more gods or goddesses, such as Vishnu, Shiva, Shakti and so on. The term sampradaya is used for branches with a particular founder-guru with a particular philosophy.

Hinduism has no central doctrinal authority and many practising Hindus do not claim to belong to any particular denomination or tradition. Four major traditions are, however, used in scholarly studies: Vaishnavism, Shaivism, Shaktism and Smartism. These are sometimes referred to as the denominations of Hinduism, and they differ in the primary deity at the centre of the tradition. A notable feature of Hindu denominations is that they do not deny other concepts of the divine or deity, and often celebrate the other as henotheistic equivalent. The denominations of Hinduism, states Lipner, are unlike those found in major religions of the world, because Hindu denominations are fuzzy with individuals practising more than one, and he suggests the term "Hindu polycentrism".

Although Hinduism contains many denominations and philosophies, it is linked by shared concepts, recognisable rituals, cosmology, shared textual resources, pilgrimage to sacred sites and the questioning of authority.

Typology
The word Hindu is an exonym. This word Hindu is derived from the Indo-Aryan and Sanskrit word Sindhu, which means "a large body of water", covering "river, ocean". It was used as the name of the Indus River and also referred to its tributaries. The actual term 'hindu' first occurs, states Gavin Flood, as "a Persian geographical term for the people who lived beyond the river Indus (Sanskrit: Sindhu)". Hindus are persons who regard themselves as culturally, ethnically, or religiously adhering to aspects of Hinduism. Historically, the term has also been used as a geographical, cultural, and later religious identifier for people living in the Indian subcontinent. In the 18th century, European merchants and colonists began to refer to the followers of Indian religions collectively as Hindus until about mid 20th century. Hindus subscribe to a diversity of ideas on spirituality and traditions, but have no ecclesiastical order, no unquestionable religious authorities, no governing body, no prophet(s) nor any binding holy book; Hindus can choose to be polytheistic, pantheistic, monotheistic, monistic, agnostic, atheistic or humanist.

Hinduism as it is commonly known can be subdivided into a number of major currents. Of the historical division into six darsanas (philosophies), two schools, Vedanta and Yoga, are currently the most prominent. Classified by primary deity or deities, four major Hinduism modern currents are Vaishnavism (Vishnu), Shaivism (Shiva), Shaktism (Shakti) and Smartism (five deities treated as same). These deity-centered denominations feature a synthesis of various philosophies such as Samkhya, Yoga and Vedanta, as well as shared spiritual concepts such as moksha, dharma, karma, samsara, ethical precepts such as ahimsa, texts (Upanishads, Puranas, Mahabharata, Agamas), ritual grammar and rites of passage.

Six generic types (McDaniel)
McDaniel (2007) distinguishes six generic types of Hinduism, in an attempt to accommodate a variety of views on a rather complex subject:
 Folk Hinduism, based on local traditions and cults of local deities and extending back to prehistoric times, or at least prior to written Vedas.
 Shrauta or "Vedic" Hinduism as practised by traditionalist brahmins (Shrautins).
 Vedantic Hinduism, including Advaita Vedanta (Smartism), based on the philosophical approach of the Upanishads.
 Yogic Hinduism, especially the sect based on the Yoga Sutras of Patanjali.
 "Dharmic" Hinduism or "daily morality", based on Karma and upon societal norms such as Vivāha (Hindu marriage customs).
 Bhakti or devotionalist practices

Sampradaya

In Hinduism, a sampradaya (IAST ) is a denomination. These are teaching traditions with autonomous practices and monastic centers, with a guru lineage, with ideas developed and transmitted, redefined and reviewed by each successive generation of followers. A particular guru lineage is called parampara. By receiving diksha (initiation) into the parampara of a living guru, one belongs to its proper sampradaya.

Number of adherents
There are no census data available on demographic history or trends for the traditions within Hinduism.

According to Gavin Flood, the Shaivism and Shaktism traditions are difficult to separate, as many Shaiva Hindus revere the goddess Shakti regularly. The denominations of Hinduism, states Julius Lipner, are unlike those found in major religions of the world, because Hindu denominations are fuzzy with individuals revering gods and goddesses polycentrically, with many Shaiva and Vaishnava adherents recognizing Sri (Lakshmi), Parvati, Saraswati and other aspects of the goddess Devi. Similarly, Shakta Hindus revere Shiva and goddesses such as Parvati (such as Durga, Radha, Sita and others) and Saraswati important in Shaiva and Vaishnava traditions.

Main denominations

Vaishnavism

Vaishnavism is a devotional stream of Hinduism, which worships the god Vishnu as the Supreme Lord (Svayam Bhagavan). As well as Vishnu himself, followers of the denomination also worship Vishnu's ten incarnations (the Dashavatara). The two most-worshipped incarnations of Vishnu are Krishna (especially within  Krishnaism as the Supreme) and Rama, whose stories are told in the Mahabharata and the Ramayana, respectively. The adherents of this sect are generally non-ascetic, monastic and devoted to meditative practice and ecstatic chanting. Vaishnavites are deeply devotional. Their religion is rich in saints, temples and scriptures.

Among Historical Vishnuism are known the Bhagavatism, Pancharatra and Vaikhanasa traditions.

The major living Vaishnava sampradayas include:
 Sri Vaishnavism ( Sri-Vaishnava Sampradaya/Sri Sampradaya/Iyengars/Vishistadvaita) is associated with Lakshmi. The principal acharyas are Ramanujacharya and Vedanta Desikan. Sri subsampradayas:
 Thenkalais. Manavala Mamunigal's sect is the oldest Vaishnava sect in India. This sampradaya was followed by Vyasa, Parasara, Bodhayana. The lineage of Acharya is Lord Narayana, next Lakshmi and then Vishweksenar, Nammalwar, Nathamuni, Uyyakondar, Manakal Nambi, Alavandar, Periya Nambi, Ramanujacharya and finally Vedanta Desikan as per the Vadagalai sampradaya.
 Vadakalais
 Munitraya
 Ramanandi Sampradaya, also known as the Ramayat Sampradaya or the Ramavat Sampradaya adheres to the teachings of the Advaita scholar Ramananda. This is the largest monastic group within Hinduism and in Asia, and these Vaishnava monks are known as Ramanandis, Vairagis or Bairagis.
 Brahma Sampradaya is associated with Vishnu, who is the Para-Brahma (Universal Creator), not to be confused with the Brahma deity. The founder of this sampradaya was the Dvaita Vedanta philosopher Madhvacharya. Its modern form is Haridasa and Sadh Vaishnavism.
 Gaudiya Vaishnavism ( Chaitanya Sampradaya) is associated with Brahma Sampradaya, and is associated with Chaitanya Mahaprabhu (Gaurangacharya):
 Brahmanic traditional lineages
 Sri Caitanya Prema Samsthana
 Gaudiya Math reform lineages
 Gaudiya Mission
 Gaudiya Vedanta Samiti
 International Society for Krishna Consciousness (ISKCON)
 ISKCON Revival Movement
 Science of Identity Foundation
 Sri Caitanya Sangha
 Sri Chaitanya Saraswat Math
 Sri Sri Radha Govindaji Trust
 World Vaisnava Association
 Manipuri Vaishnavism is a regional form of Gaudiya Vaishnavism and continues to be followed across Manipur with well-defined traditions and devotional practices.
 Kumara Sampradaya ( Nimbarka Sampradaya) is the tradition associated with Four Kumaras and the principal acharya Nimbarkacharya.
 Rudra Sampradaya. The principal acharya is Vallabhacharya, the founder of Pushtimarg tradition.
 Warkari Sampradaya, adheres to teaching of prominent bhakti saints of Maharashtra like Namadeva, Jnaneshwara, Eknath, Tukaram as well as Changadeva, Muktabai, Gora Kumbhar, Savata Mali, Narahari Sonar, Janabai, Sena Nhavi and Kanhopatra. The Warkari Sampradaya promotes the worship of god Vithoba, which is a manifestation of Krishna.
Minor and regional Vaishnavite schools and the principal acharyas connected with them are:
 Balmikism, linked to sage Valmiki.
 Ekasarana Dharma ( Asomiya Vaishnavism), adheres to the teachings of Srimanta Sankaradeva.
 Kapadi Sampradaya.
 Mahanam Sampradaya, adheres to the teachings of Prabhu Jagadbandu who is considered to be the incarnation of Chaitanya Mahaprabhu the founder of Gaudiya Vaishnavism considered to be an avatar of Radha Krishna.
 Mahanubhava panth, adheres to the teachings of Sarvajna Shri Chakradhara.
 Odia Vaishnavism ( Jagannathism), the regional cult of the god Jagannath as abstract form of Krishna.
 Pranami (Pranami Sampradaya), adheres to the teachings of Devachandra Maharaj.
 Radha Vallabh Sampradaya.
 Ramsnehi Sampradaya.
 Vaishnava-Sahajiya (tantric).  
 Baul.
 Swaminarayan Sampradya, adheres to the teachings of Sahajanand Swami, otherwise known as Swaminarayan.

Shaivism 

Shaivas or Shaivites are those who primarily worship Shiva as the supreme god, both immanent and transcendent. Shaivism embraces at the same time monism (specifically nondualism) and dualism. To Shaivites, Shiva is both with and without form; he is the Supreme Dancer, Nataraja; and is linga, without beginning or end. Shiva is sometimes depicted as the fierce god Bhairava. Saivists are more attracted to asceticism than devotees of other Hindu sects, and may be found wandering India with ashen faces performing self-purification rituals. They worship in the temple and practice yoga, striving to be one with Shiva within.

The major schools of Śaivism include:
 Saiva Siddhanta, adheres to the teachings of Tirumular/Sundaranatha (Nandinatha Sampradaya, the monistic school) or of Meykandadeva (Meykandar Sampradaya, the dualistic school).
 Saiva Siddhanta Temple in United States.
 Shiva Advaita, adheres to the teachings of Nilakantha (Srikantha) and Appayya Dikshitar.
 Kashmir Shaivism, adheres to the teachings of Vasugupta and his disciplinic lineage, including Abhinavagupta.
 Pashupata Shaivism, adheres to the teachings of Lakulisa.
 Aghori.
 Kapalika.
 Nath.
 Adinath Sampradaya or Siddha Siddhanta, adheres to the teachings of Gorakhnatha and Matsyendranatha.
 Inchegeri Sampradaya.

Other branches:
 Lingayatism or Veerashaivism is a distinct Shaivite tradition in India, established in the 12th century by the philosopher and social reformer Basavanna. It makes several departures from mainstream Hinduism and propounds monotheism through worship centered on Lord Shiva in the form of linga or Ishtalinga. It also rejects the authority of the Vedas and the caste system.
 Aaiyyanism is a religion claiming to be a form of pure Dravidian Hinduism and identifying as a Shaivite branch. It is incorporated in the Aaiyyan World Forum.
 Indonesian Shaivism.

Shaktism

Shaktas worship Goddess as Mother Shakti, in different forms. These forms may include Kali, Parvati/Durga, Lakshmi and Saraswati. The branch of Hinduism that worships the goddess, known as Devi, is called Shaktism. Followers of Shaktism recognize Shakti as the supreme power of the universe. Devi is often depicted as Parvati (the consort of Shiva) or as Lakshmi (the consort of Vishnu). She is also depicted in other manifestations, such as the protective Durga or the violent Kali. Shaktism is closely related with Tantric Hinduism, which teaches rituals and practices for purification of the mind and body.

Animal sacrifice of cockerels, goats and to a lesser extent water buffaloes is practiced by Shakti devotees, mainly at temples of Goddesses such as Bhavani or Kali.

The main traditions are:
 Kalikula;
 Srikula.

The Goddess-centric traditions within Kashmir Shaivism are Trika and Kubjika.

Smartism

Smartas treat all deities as the same, and their temples include five deities (Pancopasana) or Panchadevata as personal saguna (divine with form) manifestation of the nirguna (divine without form) Absolute, the Brahman. The choice of the nature of God is up to the individual worshiper since different manifestations of God are held to be equivalent. It is nonsectarian as it encourages the worship of any personal god along with others such as Ganesha, Shiva, Shakti, Vishnu, Surya.

The Smarta Tradition accepts two concepts of Brahman, which are the saguna brahman – the Brahman with attributes, and nirguna brahman – the Brahman without attributes. The nirguna Brahman is the unchanging Reality, however, the saguna Brahman is posited as a means to realizing this nirguna Brahman. The concept of the saguna Brahman is considered in this tradition to be a useful symbolism and means for those who are still on their spiritual journey, but the saguna concept is abandoned by the fully enlightened once he or she realizes the identity of their own soul with that of the nirguna Brahman. A Smarta may choose any saguna deity (istadevata) such as Vishnu, Shiva, Shakti, Surya, Ganesha or any other, and this is viewed in Smarta Tradition as an interim step towards meditating on Om and true nature of supreme reality, thereby realizing the nirguna Brahman and its equivalence to one's own Atman, as in Advaita Vedanta.

The movement is credited to Shankara (~8th century CE), who is regarded as the greatest teacher and reformer of the Smartha. According to Hiltebeitel, Shankara established the nondualist interpretation of the Upanishads as the touchstone of a revived smarta tradition. The Sringeri Sharada monastery founded by Adi Shankara Acharya in Karnataka is still the centre of the Smarta sect.

Overlap
Halbfass states that, although traditions such as Shaivism and Vaishnavism may be regarded as "self-contained religious constellations", there is a degree of interaction and reference between the "theoreticians and literary representatives" of each tradition which indicates the presence of "a wider sense of identity, a sense of coherence in a shared context and of inclusion in a common framework and horizon". It is common to find Hindus revering Shiva, Vishnu and Shakti, and celebrating festivals related to them at different times of the year. Temples often feature more than one of them, and Hinduism is better understood as polycentric theosophy that leaves the choice of deity and ideas to the individual.

The key concepts and practises of the four major denominations of Hinduism can be compared as below:

Other denominations

Suryaism / Saurism

The Suryaites or Sauras are followers of a Hindu denomination that started in Vedic tradition, and worship Surya as the main visible form of the Saguna Brahman. The Saura tradition was influential in South Asia, particularly in the west, north and other regions, with numerous Surya idols and temples built between 800 and 1000 CE. The Konark Sun Temple was built in the mid 13th century. During the iconoclasm of Islamic invasions and Hindu–Muslim wars, the temples dedicated to Sun-god were among those desecrated, images smashed and the resident priests of Saura tradition were killed, states André Wink. The Surya tradition of Hinduism declined in the 12th and 13th century CE and today remains as a very small movement except in Bihar / Jharkhand and Eastern Uttar Pradesh.  Sun worship has continued to be a dominant practice in Bihar / Jharkhand and Eastern Uttar Pradesh in the form of Chhath Puja which is considered the primary festival of importance in these regions.

Ganapatism

Ganapatism is a Hindu denomination in which Lord Ganesha is worshipped as the main form of the Saguna Brahman. This sect was widespread and influential in the past and has remained important in Maharashtra.

Indonesian Hinduism

Hinduism dominated the island of Java and Sumatra until the late 16th century, when a vast majority of the population converted to Islam. Only the Balinese people who formed a majority on the island of Bali, retained this form of Hinduism over the centuries. Theologically, Balinese or Indonesian Hinduism is closer to Shaivism than to other major sects of Hinduism. The adherents consider  Acintya the supreme god, and all other gods as his manifestations.

The term "Agama Hindu Dharma", the endonymous Indonesian name for "Indonesian Hinduism" can also refer to the traditional practices in Kalimantan, Sumatra, Sulawesi and other places in Indonesia, where people have started to identify and accept their agamas as Hinduism or Hindu worship has been revived. The revival of Hinduism in Indonesia has given rise to a national organisation, the Parisada Hindu Dharma.

Shrautism

Shrauta communities are very rare in India, the most well known being the ultra-orthodox Nambudiri Brahmins of Kerala. They follow the "Purva-Mimamsa" (earlier portion of Vedas) in contrast to Vedanta followed by other Brahmins. They place importance on the performance of Vedic Sacrifice (Yajna). The Nambudiri Brahmins are famous for their preservation of the ancient Somayaagam, Agnicayana rituals which have vanished in other parts of India.

Kaumaram

Kaumaram is a sect of Hindus, especially found in South India and Sri Lanka where Lord Muruga Karttikeya is the Supreme Godhead. Lord Muruga is considered superior to the Trimurti. The worshippers of Lord Muruga are called Kaumaras.

Dattatreya Sampradaya

Dattatreya Sampradaya is a Hindu denomination associated with the worship of Dattatreya as the supreme god. This denomination found in Indian states like Maharashtra, Andhra Pradesh, Karnataka, Goa, Telangana, Gujarat, Madhya Pradesh, Rajasthan and Uttarakhand. Dattatreya is often considered as an avatara of three Hindu gods Brahma, Vishnu and Shiva, collectively known as the Trimurti.
Main traditions linked with Dattatreya Sampradaya are: 
 Gurucharitra tradition - This tradition is named after the Marathi text Gurucharitra and it is based on the teachings of Nrusinha Saraswati as well as Shripada Shrivallabha. This tradition is widespread in Deccan region.
 Avadhuta Tradition.

Sant Mat

The Sant Mat was a group of reformer poet-sants and their adherents within Hinduism during the 14th–17th centuries who had desire for religious pluralism and non-ritualistic spirituality. Due to Kabir's affiliation with Vaishnavite Ramanandi Sampradaya and certain aspects of the creed, the Sant Mat is sometimes seen as part of Vaishnavism. Among its living traditions are:
 Dadupanth
 Kabir panth
 Ravidassia religion
 Sadh
 Udasi
 Nirmala
 Nanak Panth

Newer movements

The Hindu new religious movements that arose in the 19th to 20th century include:
 American Meditation Institute
 Ananda (Ananda Yoga)
 Ananda Ashrama
 Ananda Marga
 Art of Living Foundation
 Arya Samaj
 Ayyavazhi
 Brahma Kumaris
 Brahmoism (Brahmo Samaj)
 Adi Dharm
 Sadharan Brahmo Samaj
 Chinmaya Mission
 Datta Yoga
 Divine Life Society
 Hanuman Foundation
 Himalayan Institute of Yoga Science and Philosophy
 Hindutva
Akhil Bharat Hindu Mahasabha
Hindu Janajagruti Samiti
Sanatan Sanstha
Hindu Munnani
Hindu Sena
Hindu Yuva Vahini
 Rashtriya Swayamsevak Sangh (a.k.a. Sangh Parivar)
Hindu Jagran Manch
 Vishva Hindu Parishad
International Vedanta Society
 Isha Foundation
Kriya Yoga Centers
 Mahima Dharma
 Mata Amritanandamayi Math
 Matua Mahasangha
 Meivazhi
 Narayana Dharma
 Nilachala Saraswata Sangha
 Oneness Movement
 Prarthana Samaj
 Ramakrishna Mission / Ramakrishna Math (a.k.a. Vedanta Society)
 Sahaja Yoga
 Sathya Sai Baba movement
 Satsang
 Satya Dharma
 School of Philosophy and Economic Science
 Self-Realization Fellowship / Yogoda Satsanga
 Shirdi Sai Baba movement
 Shri Ram Chandra Mission
 Shree Shree Anandamayee Sangha
 Siddha Yoga
 Sivananda Yoga Vedanta Centres
 Sri Aurobindo Ashram
 Sri Chinmoy Centres
 Sri Ramana Ashram
 Neo-Advaita
 Society of Abidance in Truth
 Swadhyay Parivar
 Transcendental Meditation
 Virat Hindustan Sangam

Sarnaism

Sarna  are sacred groves in the Indian religious traditions of the Chota Nagpur Plateau region in the states of Jharkhand, Bihar, Assam and Chhattisgarh. Followers of these rituals primarily belong to the Munda, Bhumij, Kharia, Baiga, Ho, Kurukh and Santal. According to local belief, a Gram deoti or village deity resides in the sarna, where sacrifice is offered twice a year.  Their belief system is called "Sarnaism", "Sarna Dharma" or "Religion of the Holy Woods".

Kiratism

The practice is also known as Kirat Veda, Kirat-Ko Veda or Kirat Ko Ved. According to some scholars, such as Tom Woodhatch, it is shamanism, animistic religion or blend of shamanism, animism (e.g., ancestor worshiping of Yuma Sammang/Tagera Ningwaphumang and Paruhang/Sumnima), and Shaivism.

Related denominations

Kalash religion

The Indo-Aryan Kalash people in Pakistan traditionally practice an indigenous religion which some authors characterise as a form of ancient Hinduism.

Contemporary Sant Mat 

The contemporary Sant Mat is a 19th-century origin movement. Scholars are divided as to whether to call Radha Soami a 1) Sikh-derived or 2) Hindu–Sikh-synthesed or 3) independent version of the medieval Sant Mat as new universal religion.
 Advait Mat
 Radha Soami
 Radha Soami Satsang Beas
 Radha Soami Satsang Dayalbagh
 Radha Swami Satsang Dinod
 Ruhani Satsang
 Radha Soami-influenced
 Ancient Teachings of the Masters
 Dera Sacha Sauda
 Eckankar
 Elan Vital, formerly Divine Light Mission
 Manavta Mandir
 Movement of Spiritual Inner Awareness
 Science of Spirituality
 Sawan Kirpal Ruhani Mission

Slavic Vedism 

Slavic, Russian, Peterburgian  Vedism or simply Vedism are terms used to describe the one of the earliest branch of Slavic Native Faith ("Rodnovery")—contemporary indigenous development of Vedic forms of religion in Russia, especially of Saint Petersburg's communities, other Slavic countries, and generally all the post-Soviet states. The word "Vedism" comes from the verb "to know" (vedatʼ)—a semantic root which is shared in Slavic and Sanskrit languages alike.

Slavic Vedism involves the worship of Vedic gods, characterised by its use of indigenous Slavic rituals and Slavic names for the deities, distinguishing from other groups which have maintained a stronger bond with modern Hinduism, although Krishnaite groups often identify themselves as "Vedic" too. Also some syncretic groups within Slavic Native Faith (Slavic Neopaganism) use the term "Vedism".

Cross-denominational influences

Atman Jnana

Jñāna is a Sanskrit word that means knowledge. In Vedas it means true knowledge, that (atman) is identical with Brahman. It is also referred to as Atma Jnana which is frequently translated as self-realization.

Bhakti movement

The Bhakti movement was a theistic devotional trend that originated in the seventh-century Tamil south India (now parts of Tamil Nadu and Kerala), and spread northwards. It swept over east and north India from the fifteenth-century onwards, reaching its zenith between the 15th and 17th century CE. The Bhakti movement regionally developed as Hindu denominations around different gods and goddesses, such as Vaishnavism (Vishnu), Shaivism (Shiva), Shaktism (Shakti goddesses), and Smartism. The movement was inspired by many poet-saints, who championed a wide range of philosophical positions ranging from theistic dualism of Dvaita to absolute monism of Advaita Vedanta. Scriptures of the Bhakti movement include the Bhagavad Gita, Bhagavata Purana and Padma Purana.

As part of the legacy of the Alvars, five Vaishnava philosophical traditions (sampradayas) has developed at the later stages.

Philosophical schools

The schools are:
Samkhya, a non theistic and strongly dualist theoretical exposition of consciousness and matter.
Yoga, a school emphasizing meditation, contemplation and liberation.
Nyaya or logic, explores sources of knowledge. Nyāya Sūtras.
Vaisheshika, an empiricist school of atomism
Mimāṃsā, an anti-ascetic and anti-mysticist school of orthopraxy
Vedanta, the last segment of knowledge in the Vedas, or the 'Jnan' (knowledge) 'Kanda' (section).

The nāstika/heterodox schools are (in chronological order):
Cārvāka
Jainism
Ājīvika
Buddhism
Ajñana

However, medieval philosophers like Vidyāraṇya classified Indian philosophy into sixteen schools, where schools belonging to Saiva, Pāṇini and Raseśvara thought are included with others, and the three Vedantic schools Advaita, Vishishtadvaita and Dvaita (which had emerged as distinct schools by then) are classified separately.

In  Hindu history, the distinction of the six orthodox schools was current in the Gupta period "golden age" of Hinduism. With the disappearance of Vaisheshika and Mimamsa, it was obsolete by the later Middle Ages and modern times, when the various sub-schools of Vedanta began to rise to prominence as the main divisions of religious philosophy, as follows:
Advaita Vedanta
Akshar-Purushottam Darshan
Bhedabheda
Achintya Bheda Abheda
Dvaitadvaita
Dvaita Vedanta
Integral yoga
Pratyabhijna
Shaiva Siddhanta
Shiva Advaita
Shuddhadvaita
Vishishtadvaita

Nyaya survived into the 17th century as Navya Nyaya "Neo-Nyaya", while Samkhya gradually lost its status as an independent school, its tenets absorbed into Yoga and Vedanta.

Yoga varieties

Ananda Yoga
Bhakti yoga
Hatha yoga
Bihar School of Yoga
Integral Yoga
Jivamukti Yoga
Jnana yoga
Karma yoga
Kripalu Yoga
Kriya Yoga
Kundalini yoga
Raja yoga
Sahaja Yoga
Siddha Yoga
Sivananda yoga
Surat Shabd Yoga
Tantric Yoga

See also

 Donyipoloism
 Sanamahism
 Shanmata
 List of Hindu organisations

Notes

References

Sources

 
 
  Vol. 1 | Vol. 2 | Vol. 3 | Vol. 4 | Vol. 5.

External links
 
 Overview of the four divisions of Hinduism
 Description of four denominations

 
Religious denominations